Sanja Fidler is an associate professor at the University of Toronto and Director of AI at Nvidia. She is also a co-founder of the Vector Institute, University of Toronto and Canada CIFAR AI Chair. Her research is in the areas of computer vision and artificial intelligence.

Education
Fidler attended the University of Ljubljana, where she received a BSc in Applied Mathematics in 2002 and a Ph.D. in Computer Science in 2010.  Following that she was a visiting scientist at UC Berkeley and a postdoctoral scholar at the University of Toronto.

Career
Fidler's major research interests include 2D and 3D object detection, object segmentation and image labeling, and 3D scene understanding. Several of her works have received popular press coverage, including a pop-song generator and an algorithm to suggest fashion improvements.

Prior to joining the University of Toronto, she was an assistant professor at the Toyota Technological Institute at Chicago (TTIC). In 2018, she was appointed a Director of AI at Nvidia.

Awards
Among Fidler's awards are the Connaught New Researcher Award, an NVIDIA Pioneers of AI Award, Amazon Academic Research Award, and Facebook Faculty Award.  She served as Program Chair of ICCV 2021. She has also served as Area Chair of several machine learning and vision conferences including NeurIPS, ICLR, CVPR, ICCV, and ECCV.

References

Canadian women academics
Academic staff of the University of Toronto
Computer vision researchers
Year of birth missing (living people)
Living people